Tore Østby (born 1972) is a founder, guitarist, producer, and songwriter for Norwegian progressive metal band Conception. After the band stopped playing on a permanent basis (the band was active from 1989 to 1998 and went on a 10-year hiatus) he, along with John Macaluso and Jørn Lande formed progressive metal band Ark.

Tore is currently working as a senior advisor at GramArt, an organization established in 1989 to protect the recording artists’ intellectual property rights, other legal rights, and professional interests.

On 30 April 2018 it was announced that Tore's original band Conception was reunited with new material.

Tore is married to Swedish guitarist Maria Engström Østby and they live with daughter Matilda in Stockholm.

Discography

With Conception
Studio albums
 The Last Sunset (1991)
 Parallel Minds (1993)
 In Your Multitude (1995)
 Flow (1997)
 State of Deception (2020)
EPs
 My Dark Symphony (2018)

With Ark
 Ark (1999)
 Burn the Sun (2001)

With D.C. Cooper
 D.C. Cooper (1999)

With Jørn Lande
 Starfire (2000)

With Street Legal
 Bite the Bullet (2009)

References

External links
 Tore Østby representing GramArt in Norwegian newspaper Dagbladet

1972 births
Living people
Norwegian guitarists
Norwegian male guitarists
Norwegian heavy metal musicians
Norwegian songwriters
Ark (Norwegian band) members
21st-century Norwegian guitarists
21st-century Norwegian male musicians